The 2017 Faroe Islands Cup was the 63rd edition of Faroe Islands domestic football cup. The competition started on 1 April and ended on 26 August. KÍ were the defending champions, having won their sixth cup title the previous year, but were eliminated in the semifinals by the eventual champions NSÍ, which qualified for the first qualifying round of the 2018–19 UEFA Europa League.

Only the first teams of Faroese football clubs were allowed to participate. Teams from all divisions entered the competition in the first round.

Participating clubs

TH – Title Holders

Round and draw dates

First round
Entering this round are all ten clubs from Effodeildin, three from 1. deild, one from 2. deild and two from 3. deild.

|}

Quarter-finals

|}

Semi-finals

|}

Final

Top goalscorers

References

External links
Cup in Faroe Soccer

Faroe Islands Cup seasons
Cup
Faroe Islands Cup